The FIM Flat Track World Championship is the premier competition organized by FIM on the sport of flat track racing. It takes place every year as a calendar competition on different locations across the world. It was first contested in 2011 and Italian rider Francesco Cecchini has won the championship a record 6 times in a row.

Medalists

References

External links
 Inaugural season
 2012 season
 2014 season
 2015 season
 Overall tables per year

Motorcycle speedway
World championships